The Intellectuals League of Georgia is a left-wing political party in Georgia. 
At the 2004 Georgian parliamentary election, the party was part of the Jumber Patiashvili - Unity alliance.

Political parties in Georgia (country)
Social democratic parties in Georgia (country)
Centre-left parties in Georgia (country)